The 2021–22 Slovak 1. Liga season was the 29th season of the Slovak 1. Liga, the second level of ice hockey in Slovakia.

Regular season

Standings
Each team played 44 games: playing each of the other eleven teams four times – 2x at home, 2x away. At the end of the regular season, the team that finished with the most points was crowned the league champion. Each 1HL team played two matches with SR 18 (1x at home and 1x outside) to support the preparation of the SR team for MS U18.

Playoffs
Ten teams qualify for the playoffs: the top six teams in the regular season have a bye to the quarterfinals, while teams ranked seventh to tenth meet each other (7 versus 10, 8 versus 9) in a preliminary playoff round.

Bracket

Wild card round

Quarterfinals

Semifinals

Finals

Relegation
Regular season 12th placed Brezno will play a best-of-7 series against the 2. Liga winner Trebišov.

Final rankings

References

External links
Official website

Slovak 1. Liga seasons
Slovakia
Slovakia
2021–22 in Slovak ice hockey leagues